Karaveddy is a town located 7 km from the City of Point Pedro, Jaffna District, Sri Lanka.  In local Tamil Language it translates to Coastal Strip, although it is few km from the coast. Karaveddy Pradeshya Sabha is the administrative office for this region. Main town area of Karaveddy is called as Nelliady.

Karaveddy is the birthplace of many popular personalities like V.K.Sittampalam, the first Sri Lankan Postmaster general, P. Kandiah, the first and only Communist Member of Parliament elected to represent Point Pedro electorate, M. Sivasithamparam, M.P for Uduppiddy & Nallur and the Deputy Speaker of Sri Lankan Parliament, S. Sivagnanasundaram, the Editor of "Chiriththiran" magazine, Prof. K. Sivathamby, Ceylon's (Sri Lanka) famous grapes vineyard owner, V.S.Thamotharampillai and many others. Anton Balasingham, the Political Adviser of the LTTE, lived during his childhood and early youth in Karaveddy.

"Karavai Velan Kovai" is an ancient literary work dedicated to a feudal landlord lived in Karaveddy. "Karavai" is a shortened name of this village.

Karaveddy is well known for its culture and religious places.

Famous Schools 

 Nelliady Central College
 Vadamaradchy Central Ladies College
 Vigneswara College
 Udupiddy American Mission College
 Udupiddy Girls' College

References

Towns in Jaffna District
Vadamarachchi South West DS Division